João Filipe Amorim Gomes (born 26 July 1992), known as Amorim, is a Portuguese professional footballer who plays for Leixões S.C. as a right-back.

He played 19 games in the Primeira Liga for Vitória S.C. and Belenenses but spent most of his career in LigaPro, making over 150 appearances in service of seven teams.

Club career
Born in Ribeirão, Vila Nova de Famalicão, Amorim began his development at hometown club G.D. Ribeirão and concluded it at Vitória SC. In 2011, he was loaned to S.C. Freamunde of the second division, where he made his professional debut.

In January 2015, Amorim cancelled his contract and signed with second tier side Académico de Viseu F.C. until the end of the season. He returned to the Primeira Liga in June, on a deal of undisclosed length at C.F. Os Belenenses.

Amorim dropped back down a level in June 2016, joining C.D. Aves. He played just under half of their games as they won promotion as runners-up to Portimonense SC, and scored on the final day in a 3–0 home win against AD Fafe.

Amorim continued competing in division two the following years, representing F.C. Arouca, Varzim SC, C.D. Cova da Piedade and Leixões SC.

References

External links

1992 births
Living people
People from Vila Nova de Famalicão
Sportspeople from Braga District
Portuguese footballers
Association football defenders
Primeira Liga players
Liga Portugal 2 players
Campeonato de Portugal (league) players
Vitória S.C. players
S.C. Freamunde players
Vitória S.C. B players
Académico de Viseu F.C. players
C.F. Os Belenenses players
C.D. Aves players
F.C. Arouca players
Varzim S.C. players
C.D. Cova da Piedade players
Leixões S.C. players
Portugal youth international footballers
Portugal under-21 international footballers